is a Japanese manga series written by Takeshi Natsuhara and Hiroki Miyashita and illustrated by Miyashita. It has been serialized in Shogakukan's seinen manga magazine Monthly Sunday Gene-X since July 2019, with its chapters collected into eight tankōbon volumes as of June 2022.

Premise
A good-hearted old man yakuza dies on the job. He wakes up in another world in the body of a young princess, retaining his back tattoo and strength; the old man takes the situation in stride, not bothering with any regal or ladylike behavior. None of the princess' retainers realize their lady is gone, but follow the old man's lead in rebuilding the princess' territory with yakuza chivalry.

Publication 
Yakuza Reincarnation is written by Takeshi Natsuhara and Hiroki Miyashita and illustrated by Miyashita. It started in Shogakukan's seinen manga magazine Monthly Sunday Gene-X on July 19, 2019. Shogakukan has collected its chapters into individual tankōbon volumes. The first volume was released on January 17, 2020. As of August 19, 2022, nine volumes have been released.

In July 2021, Seven Seas Entertainment announced that they had licensed the manga for English release in North America, to start publishing in March 2022.

Volume list

Notes

References

External links 
  
 

Comedy anime and manga
Fiction about reincarnation
Isekai anime and manga
Seinen manga
Seven Seas Entertainment titles
Shogakukan manga
Yakuza in anime and manga